The 2015–16 San Diego State Aztecs women's basketball team represents San Diego State University in the 2015–16 college basketball season. The Aztecs, led by third year head coach Stacie Terry. The Aztecs played their home games at the Viejas Arena and were members of the Mountain West Conference. They finished the season 12–19, 6–12 in Mountain West play to finish in a tie for eighth place. They advanced to the quarterfinals of the Mountain West women's tournament where they lost to Colorado State.

Roster

Schedule

|-
!colspan=9 style="background:#C23038; color:#231F20;"| Exhibition

|-
!colspan=9 style="background:#C23038; color:#231F20;"| Non-conference regular season

|-
!colspan=9 style="background:#C23038; color:#231F20;"| Mountain West regular season

|-
!colspan=9 style="background:#C23038; color:#231F20;"| Mountain West Women's Tournament

See also
2015–16 San Diego State Aztecs men's basketball team

References

San Diego State
San Diego State Aztecs women's basketball seasons